The Ghriba synagogue bombing was carried out by Niser bin Muhammad Nasr Nawar on the El Ghriba synagogue in Tunisia in 2002.

Bombing
On April 11, 2002, a natural gas truck fitted with explosives drove past security barriers at the ancient El Ghriba synagogue on the Tunisian island of Djerba. The truck detonated at the front of the synagogue, killing 14 German tourists, three Tunisians, and two French nationals. More than 30 others were wounded.

Although the explosion was initially called an accident, as Tunisia, France, and Germany investigated, it became clear that it was a deliberate attack. A 24-year-old man named Niser bin Muhammad Nasr Nawar was the suicide bomber, who carried out the attack with the aid of a relative. Al-Qaeda later claimed responsibility for the attack, which was reportedly organized by Khalid Sheikh Mohammed and Saad bin Laden. However, Saad's family denied he was involved in the attack.

In March 2003, five people were arrested in Spain who were believed to have financed this attack. In April 2003, a German man named Christian Ganczarski was arrested in Paris in connection with the bombing. He was arrested by a joint intelligence operation, in the frame of Alliance Base, which is located in Paris, and transferred to Fresnes Prison in Paris. In February 2009, Ganczarski was sentenced to 18 years in prison for the bombing.

Commemoration of the victims
10 years after the attack, thanks to freedom of expression and organization brought by the 2011 Tunisian revolution, a Djerbian citizens' initiative to break the silence was adopted by the Presidency of the Republic and concerned embassies to commemorate victims of this attack.

On April 11, 2012, Tunisian President Moncef Marzouki, Professor , the Ambassador of the Federal Republic of Germany to Tunisia, and Boris Boillon, Ambassador of the French Republic to Tunisia, marched silently in homage to the victims. Moncef Marzouki met with present victims' families and delivered a memorial speech where he strongly condemned this attack and expressed on behalf of the people of Tunisia and the Tunisian government a deep compassion for victims and their families.

See also
 List of terrorist incidents in Tunisia

References

2002 in Judaism
2002 murders in Tunisia
21st-century attacks on synagogues and Jewish communal organizations
21st-century mass murder in Africa
Al-Qaeda attacks
Antisemitism in Tunisia
April 2002 crimes
April 2002 events in Africa
Attacks on buildings and structures in 2002

Attacks on religious buildings and structures in Africa
Djerba
Explosions in Tunisia
Improvised explosive device bombings in 2002
Islam and antisemitism
Islamic terrorism in Tunisia
Islamic terrorist incidents in 2002
Jews and Judaism in Tunisia
Mass murder in 2002
Mass murder in Tunisia
Murder in Tunis
Suicide car and truck bombings in Africa
Terrorist incidents in Tunis
Terrorist incidents in Tunisia in 2002
Attacks in Africa in 2002
2002 disasters in Tunisia